Ernst Adolf Alfred Oskar Adalbert von Dobschütz (9 October 1870 – 20 May 1934) was a German theologian, textual critic, author of numerous books and professor at the University of Halle, the University of Breslau, and the University of Strasbourg. He also lectured in the United States and Sweden.

He was born and died in Halle.

Life 

Dobschütz was born into an old noble family of Silesia. He was a son of the Prussian colonel Adalbert von Dobschütz de Basse-Silesia and of his second wife Anna, Baroness von Seckendorff. His older half-brother (from his father's first marriage) was Prussian general of division Carl von Seckendorff. On 29 December 1919, in Halle (Saale), Dobschütz married Karin von Kronhelm (24 March 1893 in Breslau, † 7 May 1986 in Halle), daughter of the Prussian general of division Curt von Kronhelm and Clara Schwarz. Their marriage remained childless.

In 1888 he began his theological studies at the University of Leipzig under professors Franz Delitzsch and Christoph Ernst Luthardt. In 1910, he became professor in the University of Breslau; in 1913, he accepted a call to the University of Halle, where he taught until his death in 1934, with the exception of the years 1913 and 1914, when he taught at Harvard University.

He examined some manuscripts like Codex Tischendorfianus III.

After the death of textual critic Caspar René Gregory, Dobschütz became his successor, and in 1933 he expanded the list of New Testament manuscripts, increasing the number of papyri from 19 to 48, the number of uncials from 169 to 208, the number of minuscules from 2326 to 2401, and the number of lectionaries from 1565 to 1609. His recovery work influenced the later work of Kurt Aland, who revived the tradition in 1953 and further expanded the number of New Testament manuscripts.

A dedicated Christian, Von Dobschütz was a member of the Order of Saint John (Bailiwick of Brandenburg).  He was a member of German National People's Party from 1919 to its dissolution in 1933.

Honours 
 Knight of Justice (Rechtsritter) of Saint John
 Membership in the Society of Biblical Literature in (USA, 1913)
 Red Cross-Medallion 3. Class (World War I)
 Red Cross-Medallion 2. Class (World War I)
 On 13 January 1934 (the 120th anniversary of the capture of Wittenberg in the Napoleaonic wars by troops of Generalleutnant Leopold Wilhelm von Dobschütz) part of the Große Rothemarkstraße was renamed the Dobschützstraße, with Dobschütz representing the family.

Works 

 1894: 
 1899: 
 1902: « Der Roman in der Altchristlichen Literatur » ; in: Die Deutsche Rundschau 111 (1902)
 1902: Die urchristlichen Gemeinden; Sittengeschichtliche Bilder ; Leipzig: J. C. Hinrichs'sche Buchhandlung, 1902
 1902: « Der Prozess Jesu nach den Acta Pilati » ; in: Zeitschrift für die neutestamentliche Wissenschaft und die Kunde der älteren Kirche, 1902
 1904: Probleme des apostolischen Zeitalters. Fünf Vorträge in Hannover im Oktober 1903 ; Leipzig: J. C. Hinrichs'sche Buchhandlung, 1904
 1904: Christian Life in the Primitive Church ; New York : Putnam's Verlag, 1904
 1905: « Sakrament und Symbol » ; in : Studien und Kritiken, 1905
 1906: Das apostolische Zeitalter; Tübingen: Mohr, 1906
 1908: Das Christentum in Wissenschaft und Bildung; en collaboration avec C. Cornill, W. Herrmann, W. Staerk; Leipzig : Quelle & Meyer, 1908
 1908: « Griechentum und Christentum » ; in : Paul Herre (Hg.): Das Christentum; Leipzig: Quelle & Meyer, 1908
 1909: The Apostolic Age ; London : Philip Green, 1909 ; Boston : Boston American Unitarian Association, 1910
 1909: Die Thessalonicher-Briefe ; Göttingen: Vandenhoeck & Ruprecht, 1909 (Nachdruck 1974)
 1909: « Wann las Victor von Capua sein Neues Testament? » ; in : Zeitschrift für Neutestamentliche Wissenschaft 10 (1909)
 1912: Das Decretum Gelasianum de Libris recipiendis et non recipiendis; Leipzig: J. C. Hinrichs'sche Buchhandlung, 1912
 1914: The Influence of the Bible on Civilisation; Edinburgh 1914 ; New York: Scribners, (Reimpression : New York : Frederick Ungar Publishing, 1959 ; Bertrams Print on Demand, Grande-Bretagne 2005 ; Lightning Source Inc. 2005)
1917: « Das Urchristentum im Lichte unserer Zeit » ; in: Theologische Studien und Kritiken, Sonderdruck für die Mitglieder der Sächsischen Kirchlichen Konferenz 1917 ; Gotha: Friedrich Andreas Perthes, 1917
1921: « Vom vierfachen Schriftsinn. Die Geschichte einer Theorie »; in: Harnack-Ehrung: Beiträge zur Kirchengeschichte ihrem Lehrer Adolf von Harnack zu seinem siebzigsten Geburtstag (7. Mai 1921) dargebracht von einer Reihe seiner Schüler; Leipzig 1921
1923: Eberhard Nestle's Einführung in das Griechische Neue Testament ; Göttingen: Vandenhoeck & Ruprecht, 1923
1924–33: « Zur Liste der neutestamentlichen Handschriften » ; in : Zeitschrift für die neutestamentliche Wissenschaft und die Kunde der älteren Kirche 23 (1924), pp. 248–264; 25 (1926), pp. 299–306; 27 (1928), pp. 216–222; 32 (1933), pp. 185–206
1926: Der Apostel Paulus ; 1ère partie : « Seine weltgeschichtliche Bedeutung' » ; Halle: Buchhandlung des Waisenhauses, 1926
1927: Das Neue Testament; Halle: Buchhandlung des Waisenhauses, 1927
1927: Vom Auslegen des Neuen Testaments. Drei Reden; Göttingen: Vandenhoeck & Ruprecht, 1927
1928: Der Apostel Paulus; 2ème partie : « Seine Stellung in der Kunst »; Halle: Buchhandlung des Waisenhauses, 1928
1928: « Matthäus als Rabbi und Katechet » ; in : Zeitschrift für die neutestamentliche Wissenschaft und die Kunde der älteren Kirche, 1928 (Imprimé à part : Wissenschaftliche Buchgesellschaft, Darmstadt 1980)
1929: « Die fünf Sinne im Neuen Testament »; in: Journal of Biblical Literature, 1929
1929: « Bludau. Die Schriftfälschungen der Häretiker. Milne, The Gospels of Augustine. Glunz, Die lat. Vorlage der westsächs. Evangelienversion »; in: Gnomon, Cahier 5 (1929), p. 330 et sqq. ; Berlin: Verlag der Weidmannschen Buchhandlung, 1929
1929: « Die Bekehrung des Paulus » ; in: Repertorium für Kunstwissenschaft 50 (1929)
1932: Das Apostolicum in biblisch-theologischer Beleuchtung; Gießen: Toepelmann, 1932
1934: « Prädestination »; in: Theologische Studien und Kritiken 106 (1934), p. 9 et sqq.; Gotha: Leopold Klotz, 1934
1934: Die Bibel im Leben der Völker; Witten: Luther-Verlag, 1934; Berlin: Evangelische Verlagsanstalt, 1936 (19542)
1934: « Zum Wortschatz und Stil des Römerbriefs »; in: Zeitschrift für die neutestamentliche Wissenschaft und die Kunde der älteren Kirche 33 (1934), p. 51 et sqq.; Gießen: Alfred Töpelmann, 1934

See also 

 Leopold Wilhelm von Dobschütz

References

External links 

 
 Kurz-Biografie unter www.catalogus-professorum-halensis.de
 
 

1870 births
1934 deaths
Writers from Halle (Saale)
German Lutheran theologians
German National People's Party politicians
People from the Province of Saxony
Leipzig University alumni
Martin Luther University of Halle-Wittenberg alumni
Academic staff of the Martin Luther University of Halle-Wittenberg
Humboldt University of Berlin alumni
University of Jena alumni
Academic staff of the University of Jena
Academic staff of the University of Strasbourg
Academic staff of the University of Breslau
Harvard University faculty
20th-century German Protestant theologians
German male non-fiction writers